Bayview is a suburb of Auckland in New Zealand. The area was included into the North Shore ward in 2010, one of the new thirteen administrative areas of the new Auckland Council.

Demographics

Bayview had a population of 9,057 at the 2018 New Zealand census, an increase of 651 people (7.7%) since the 2013 census, and an increase of 1,188 people (15.1%) since the 2006 census. There were 2,841 households, comprising 4,575 males and 4,485 females, giving a sex ratio of 1.02 males per female, with 1,833 people (20.2%) aged under 15 years, 2,145 (23.7%) aged 15 to 29, 4,404 (48.6%) aged 30 to 64, and 672 (7.4%) aged 65 or older.

Ethnicities were 54.0% European/Pākehā, 8.1% Māori, 6.1% Pacific peoples, 37.1% Asian, and 5.1% other ethnicities. People may identify with more than one ethnicity.

The percentage of people born overseas was 49.3, compared with 27.1% nationally.

Although some people chose not to answer the census's question about religious affiliation, 46.9% had no religion, 36.9% were Christian, 0.4% had Māori religious beliefs, 3.9% were Hindu, 2.2% were Muslim, 1.9% were Buddhist and 2.7% had other religions.

Of those at least 15 years old, 2,292 (31.7%) people had a bachelor's or higher degree, and 744 (10.3%) people had no formal qualifications. 1,332 people (18.4%) earned over $70,000 compared to 17.2% nationally. The employment status of those at least 15 was that 4,215 (58.3%) people were employed full-time, 1,053 (14.6%) were part-time, and 258 (3.6%) were unemployed.

Education

Bayview School is a coeducational contributing primary (years 1–6) school with a roll of  students as of  The adjoining Bayview Community Centre has an Early Learning Centre for pre-schoolers, while Bayview Kindergarten offers pre-school education for 3-5 year olds.

Manuka Primary School is a coeducational contributing primary school (years 1–6) with a roll of  students as of  The school was founded in 1968.

Notes

External links
Bayview School website

Suburbs of Auckland
North Shore, New Zealand
Kaipātiki Local Board Area